Rebecca Minkoff is a global fashion brand that was founded by brother and sister duo Rebecca Minkoff and Uri Minkoff in 2005 in New York City. The brand has  retail stores in New York, San Francisco,  Los Angeles, Hong Kong, Tokyo,  and Korea, and is distributed in over 900 stores worldwide. The Rebecca Minkoff brand carries a wide range of apparel including handbags, footwear, jewellery and accessories.

History

In 2001 Rebecca Minkoff began working on her own fashion designs. Her first taste of national recognition came when actress Jenna Elfman wore an "I Love New York" T-shirt Minkoff designed on the Jay Leno show. In 2005 Rebecca Minkoff incorporated the company  and co-founded the brand with her brother Uri Minkoff, who had founded a small handful of health-care and technology startups, joined her, and the duo officially launched Rebecca Minkoff LLC.  Since the launching the Rebecca Minkoff brand has seen been distributed in over 900 stores worldwide and has been recognized with several awards, including the Breakthrough Designer Award at the Accessories Council Excellence Awards, announced as a member of the first-ever New York State Council on Women and Girls, and has been an active member of the Council of Fashion Designers of America. Today Rebecca Minkoff has a flagship store in New York City’s Soho neighborhood, has brought their retail store concept to Chicago, and has a store wired for the next-gen shopper on Melrose Avenue in Los Angeles.

In 2018 Rebecca Minkoff announced they would no longer be presenting at New York Fashion Week, but instead chosen to focus efforts on a new, inspiring project that launched in tandem with the 2018 Women's March, RM Superwomen. RM Superwomen is a social space with one powerful goal: to encourage women around the world to be brave and courageous. The platform will not only highlight activists like the Women's March leaders, but it will also be a place for conversation and events that will hopefully inspire women to lead "fearless" lives. To kick off the new social space, Minkoff has partnered with The Women's March, launching a campaign to highlight their voices along with other key activists and influencers like actress Zosia Mamet and journalist Gretchen Carlson.

Awards
2009 New York Moves Power Women 
2010 Member, The Council of Fashion Designers of America
2011 Breakthrough Designer Award from the Accessories Council 
2013 Finalist of Ernst & Young Entrepreneur of the Year Award 
2015 Best Interactive Retail & Top Innovator at the Fashion 2.0 Awards

References

American companies established in 2005
Clothing companies established in 2005
2005 establishments in New York City
Companies based in New York City
Retail companies established in 2005